Homâyun, also romanized as Homaayoon or Homāyūn is a Persian male given name, it also appears as a surname.

Given name
Humayun, Mughal Emperor
Homayoun Behzadi (1942–2016), Iranian footballer
Homayoun Ershadi (born 1947), Iranian actor
Homayoun Katouzian (born 1942), Iranian academic
Homayoun Seraji (1947–2007), Iranian scientist
Homayoun Shahrokhi, Iranian football player, coach, and manager
Homayoun Shajarian (born 1975), Iranian singer
Homayoon Kazerooni, a roboticist and Berkley professor of Mechanical Engineering

Surname
Dariush Homayoon (1928–2011), Iranian journalist, author, and politician
Saba Homayoon (born 1977), a Canadian-Iranian actress. 
Shahram Homayoun, Iranian television channel owner

Persian masculine given names